The Danubian Principalities was a conventional name given to the Principalities of Moldavia and Wallachia, which emerged in the early 14th century. The term was coined in the Habsburg monarchy after the Treaty of Küçük Kaynarca (1774) in order to designate an area on the lower Danube with a common geopolitical situation. The term was largely used then by foreign political circles and public opinion until the union of the two principalities in 1859. Alongside Transylvania, the United Principalities of Moldavia and Wallachia became the basis for the Kingdom of Romania, and by extension the modern nation-state of Romania.

In a wider context, the concept may also apply to the Principality of Serbia as one of The Principalities of the Danube, which came under the suzerainty of the Porte from 1817.

History

Early history

The two emerged as vassals of the Hungarian Crown (in the case of Wallachia, Hungarian suzerainty had been present for the polities which preceded the unifying rule of Basarab I), and remained so until their independence (1330 for Wallachia and 1359 for Moldavia). In 1476 Wallachia and in 1538 Moldavia came under formal Ottoman suzerainty, preserving their self-rule in all aspects, except for the period of the so-called Phanariote Rule (1711 - 1821), when foreign affairs were dictated by the Sublime Porte.

After a marked decline in independence and prosperity over the 17th and 18th centuries, further independent and insurgent rules, which connected the two countries with Habsburg and Russian Empire offensives during the Great Turkish War, were blocked by the Ottomans by the introduction of Phanariote rules over the two countries (1711 in Moldavia and 1714 in Wallachia).

These, while connected with the first administrative reforms, generally had to rely on spoliation, and coincided with a disastrous stage in the countries' history, given that the two became a major theatre of war in a series of confrontations between Russian, Habsburg, and Ottoman forces (until the mid-19th century, they frequently came under temporary Russian or Habsburg occupation, and sometimes administration — as happened to the regions of Oltenia, Bukovina, and Bessarabia).

Early 19th century
Main articles: History of the Russo-Turkish Wars, National awakening of Romania

In the nineteenth century, Moldavia and Wallachia became involved in the cause of Greek independence. Backed by Phanariotes, the Filiki Eteria maneuvered in Moldavia during the anti-Phanariote and pro-Eterian 1821 Wallachian uprising. Wallachian initiative was toppled by an Eterian administration which itself retreated in the face of Ottoman invasion.

Although these events brought about the disestablishment of Phanariote rules by the Porte itself, this was of little consequence in itself, as a new Russo-Turkish War brought a period of Russian occupation under formal Ottoman supervision, extended between 1829 and the Crimean War. A parallel Russian military administration was put in place, while the two principalities were given the first common governing document (the Organic Statute): although never fully implemented, it confirmed a modernizing government, created a new legal framework that reformed public administration, and deeply influenced political life in the following decades. The Russian pressures for changes in the text were perceived by Wallachians and Moldavians as a drive to remove the territories from Ottoman rule and annex them to a much more centralised and absolutist empire. This coincided with the period of national awakening and the Revolutions of 1848 - the rejection of Russian tutelage during the Moldavian attempt and the Wallachian revolutionary period were viewed with a degree of sympathy by the Porte, but calls by Russia ultimately led to a common occupation in the years following the rebellion's crushing.

United Principalities

The aftermath of Russian defeat in 1856 (the Treaty of Paris) brought forth a period of common tutelage of the Ottomans and a Congress of Great Powers (the United Kingdom of Great Britain and Ireland, the French Empire, the Austrian Empire, the Kingdom of Prussia, the Kingdom of Piedmont-Sardinia, and, albeit never again fully, the Russian Empire). While the Moldavia-Wallachia unionist cause, which had come to dominate political demands, was viewed with sympathy by the French, Russians, Prussians, and Sardinians, it was rejected by the Austrian Empire, and viewed with suspicion by Great Britain and the Ottomans. Negotiations amounted to an agreement over a minimal and formal union - however, elections for the ad hoc divans of 1859 profited from an ambiguity in the text of the final agreement (specifying two thrones, but not preventing the same person from occupying both) and made possible the rule of Alexander Ioan Cuza as Domnitor of the United Principalities of Moldavia and Wallachia (the Romanian United Principalities from 1862). This is known as the unification of Moldavia and Wallachia.

The union was cemented by Cuza's unsanctioned interventions in the text of previous organic laws, as well as by the circumstances of his deposition in 1866, when the rapid election of Carol of Hohenzollern-Sigmaringen, who had the backing of an increasingly important Prussia, and the Austro-Prussian War made measures taken against the union impossible.

In 1878, after the Romanian War of Independence, Romania shook off formal Ottoman rule, but clashed with its Russian ally over the Russian request for the Bujak (southern Bessarabia) - ultimately, Romania was awarded Northern Dobruja in exchange for Southern Bessarabia. A Kingdom of Romania emerged in 1881.

See also
 Boyar
 History of Romania
 Hospodar
 List of rulers of Moldavia
 List of rulers of Wallachia
 Romanian Old Kingdom
 United Principalities

References

History of Moldavia
History of Wallachia
Kingdom of Romania
Modern history of Romania
Russo-Turkish War (1828–29)